Arya Vaiv is a 1994 computer game for the Amiga and MS-DOS platforms. It is a top-down space shooter with available power-ups and a constant stream of enemies.

References

1994 video games
Amiga games
DOS games
Scrolling shooters
Video games developed in Germany